Kelen may refer to:

 Kēlen, a constructed language
 Kelen, a surname; notable people include:
 Christopher Kelen (born 1958), Australian academic, writer and artist
 István Kelen (1912–2003),Hungarian table tennis player, journalist and playwright
 János Kelen (1911–1991), Hungarian long-distance runner
 József Kelen (1892–1939), Hungarian engineer and socialist
 Michael A. Kelen (born 1948), Canadian judge
 Ron Vander Kelen (1939–2016), American football player
 S. K. Kelen (born 1956), Australian poet and educator
 Tibor Kelen (1938–2001), Hungarian opera singer and cantor
 Kelen, a given name; notable people include:
 Kelen Coleman (born 1984), American actress

See also 
 Kellen, another name
 Kelan (disambiguation)